Myrtartona is a genus of moths of the family Zygaenidae.

Species
Myrtartona coronias (Meyrick, 1886)
Myrtartona leucopleura (Meyrick, 1886)
Myrtartona mariannae Tarmann, 2005
Myrtartona rufiventris (Walker, 1854)

References

Procridinae